Constitutional Assembly elections were held in Paraguay on 1 December 1991. The result was a victory for the Colorado Party, which won 122 of the 198 seats. Voter turnout was 51.7%. 

Following the elections, a new constitution was promulgated in 1992. It reintroduced the position of Vice President and allowed for the President to be elected by a plurality of the vote. It also limited the President to a single five-year term, with no possibility of re-election even if the incumbent had only served a partial term. This provision meant that incumbent Andrés Rodríguez would have had to leave office in 1993 even without his promise to not run for a full term.

Results

References

Paraguay
1991 in Paraguay
Elections in Paraguay
December 1991 events in South America